Rüştü Reçber (born 10 May 1973) is a Turkish former professional footballer and a current sports executive. During his professional career, he played as a goalkeeper for Antalyaspor, Fenerbahçe, Barcelona and Beşiktaş.

Rüştü was part of the Turkey national squad that reached the semi-finals at the 2002 FIFA World Cup and UEFA Euro 2008. At the former, where Turkey finished third, his performances saw him selected for the tournament's all-star team. He is Turkey's record appearance holder, having earned 120 caps. He made his debut against Iceland in 1994 and his final appearance came against Finland in 2012.

Rüştü was named the best goalkeeper in European competitions in 2002, selected for the 2002 UEFA Team of the Year by public vote. In 2004, he was selected to FIFA 100 by Pelé as one of the 125 best living footballers in the world.

Club career

1985–2003: Early years and Fenerbahçe
Born in Korkuteli, Rüştü began his career at nearby Antalyaspor, having converted from a forward to a goalkeeper. Early in his career, he missed out on moves to two of the Istanbul-based Big Three of Turkish football: he rejected Galatasaray at the age of 17 because coach Mustafa Denizli wanted him to start off at the youth team, and in 1993 a move to Beşiktaş fell through when he was seriously injured in a car crash.

After debuting for Turkey under-21, Rüştü was told by national manager Fatih Terim in 1992 that he would become the greatest goalkeeper in the nation's history. In 1993 he joined the last remaining of the Big Three, Fenerbahçe, spending his first season back on loan at Antalyaspor. He gained his big break in October 1994, when club and national starting goalkeeper Engin İpekoğlu injured his foot against Kayserispor; he debuted against Petrol Ofisi and went on to make 240 appearances in his first spell, also becoming captain and winning the Süper Lig twice.

2003–2004: Barcelona
In July 2003, Rüştü was very close to signing for Arsenal, but he had a dispute with manager Arsène Wenger who he felt insulted his fitness. Instead, he joined La Liga club Barcelona. After manager Frank Rijkaard chose to play Víctor Valdés in the first two league matches because Rüştü's Spanish was still very weak. Rüştü was upset by this, saying "It is not normal for a goalkeeper of my history and caliber to be left out because I don't speak Spanish."

Rüştü made his debut on 15 October 2003 in the UEFA Cup first round second leg at home to Slovakia's MŠK Púchov, an 8–0 win. He totalled only seven games – four in the league, of which the first was a 3–1 win at RCD Espanyol in the Derbi barceloní on 13 December.

2004–2012: Return to Fenerbahçe, Beşiktaş

Having played just four league games (seven overall), Rüştü was loaned back to Fenerbahçe on 27 August 2004 for the season. On 28 July 2005, this was extended for another year. In his combined two spells, Rüştü is the Fenerbahçe goalkeeper with second-most appearances, with 294 games, following Volkan Demirel.

After winning the league title for a third time with Fenerbahçe in 2006–07, Rüştü moved to city rivals Beşiktaş on a three-year deal, along with teammate Mehmet Yozgatlı. Rüştü won the league with his new team in 2008–09. He also won 2010–11 Turkish Cup where he played all 120 minutes, including penalties, as the club won the tournament.

International career

2002 FIFA World Cup

Turkey finished third in the 2002 FIFA World Cup in South Korea and Japan. Rüştü was one of two goalkeepers in the 16-man Team of the Tournament, alongside Germany's Oliver Kahn.

On 26 March 2005, captain Rüştü earned his 100th cap in a 2–0 home win over Albania in 2006 FIFA World Cup qualification.

Euro 2008
With first choice goalkeeper Volkan Demirel suspended, Rüştü started the UEFA Euro 2008 quarter-final match against Croatia. A questionable foray from his goalmouth allowed Croatia to score the match's first goal with a minute remaining in extra time. Rüştü immediately made amends for his mistake though, assisting on Semih Şentürk's injury time goal in the 122nd minute. In the ensuing penalty shootout, he faced four kicks, saving the last one from Mladen Petrić to secure Turkey's victory in the shootout and enabling Turkey to progress to the Euro semi-finals for the first time ever.

In the aftermath of the 3–2 semi-final loss to Germany, a game in which he was captain, he announced his retirement from the national team. However, he was since called up against Spain for a 2010 FIFA World Cup qualifying match. He was called up for the last time for Turkey in a game against Finland on 26 May 2012, the last of his 120 caps.

Style of play
Rüştü was renowned as a gifted shot-stopper, possessed an excellent positional sense. Using his height, he was also able to come up for high balls. He also possessed strong reflexes and good deflecting ability. Known as a penalty stopper, his shoot-out performance against Croatia in the UEFA Euro 2008 quarter-finals was described as heroic by UEFA in 2015. He was featured in a UEFA Training Ground series video under the title of Rüştü's Turkish Delight, in which he was described as a Master of Penalties. He was an eccentric goalkeeper, who also stood out for his charismatic personality. Physically, he was recognisable for his long hair and anti-glare paint under his eyes. He was also adept at taking goal kicks and clearing backpasses.

Personal life
Rüştü is married to Işıl Reçber (née: Kepe) and the couple have a son and a daughter. The couple first met in period when Rüştü just signed for Fenerbahçe from Antalyaspor, in 1994. Rüştü used to be a Galatasaray supporter in his childhood. His son, Burak, born in 2007, plays football at Galatasaray academy.

In March 2020, Reçber tested positive for COVID-19 amidst the COVID-19 pandemic. He was admitted to hospital for care where he was put under isolation. He was discharged in April.

Career statistics

Club

International

Honours
Fenerbahçe
Süper Lig: 1995–96, 2000–01, 2004–05, 2006–07
Atatürk Cup: 1998

Beşiktaş
Süper Lig: 2008–09
Turkish Cup: 2008–09, 2010–11

Turkey
FIFA World Cup third place: 2002
 UEFA European Championship bronze medalist: 2008
FIFA Confederations Cup third place: 2003

Individual
 FIFA World Cup All Star Team: 2002
 UEFA Team of the Year: 2002
 IFFHS World's Best Goalkeeper of the Year 2002: 3rd
 IFFHS Best Goalkeeper of the 21st Century: 23rd
 FIFA 100

See also
List of men's footballers with 100 or more international caps

References
 Citations

 Video References

Bibliography

External links

 
 
 

1973 births
Living people
FIFA 100
Turkish footballers
Turkish expatriate footballers
Association football goalkeepers
Antalyaspor footballers
Fenerbahçe S.K. footballers
La Liga players
Turkish expatriate sportspeople in Spain
Expatriate footballers in Spain
FC Barcelona players
Beşiktaş J.K. footballers
UEFA Euro 1996 players
UEFA Euro 2000 players
2002 FIFA World Cup players
2003 FIFA Confederations Cup players
UEFA Euro 2008 players
Turkey international footballers
Turkey under-21 international footballers
FIFA Century Club
Süper Lig players
Sportspeople from Antalya